The Tairov OKO-4 (Opytno KonstrooktOrskoye  - experimental design section) was an attack aircraft produced in the Ukrainian SSR in the USSR in 1939.

Development
This small sesquiplane attack fighter was completed in 1939, but was unsuccessful. The prototype was never flown and further work was cancelled.

Specifications (OKO-4)

See also

References

 Gunston, Bill. “The Osprey Encyclopaedia of Russian Aircraft 1875 – 1995”. London, Osprey. 1995. 

1930s Soviet attack aircraft
Sesquiplanes